Velka is a dispersed settlement in the hills to the northeast of Dravograd in the Carinthia region in northern Slovenia, next to the border with Austria.

References

External links
Velka on Geopedia

Populated places in the Municipality of Dravograd